Carlos Lorenzo Miller Junior (29 October 1963 – 19 January 2015) artistically known as Calito Soul was an artist of Reggae en Español from Panama.

Mr. Carlos Miller became (deacon) of the Christian Church called "Jesus Is The Only Way" in the town of Franklin in Virginia in the United States. The singer and integrity of Christianity, with his second wife, Mrs. Jennifer Miller will remain in the One Love One Blood to Christian order.

References 

1963 births
2015 deaths
Panamanian reggaeton musicians
People from Colón, Panama